The 1985 season was the Hawthorn Football Club's 61st season in the Victorian Football League and 84th overall.

Fixture

Premiership season

Finals series

Ladder

References

Hawthorn Football Club seasons